Polytus mellerborgi, commonly known as small banana weevil, is a species of weevil widely distributed in southeastern Polynesia through Melanesia, Micronesia, Indo-Malaya, south China, Burma, India, Sri Lanka, other islands of the Indian Ocean to Madagascar and as far as Mexico and Central America.

Description
This small beetle is about 1.0 cm to 1.1 cm in length excluding the rostrum. Due to the characteristic black color, the species can be misidentified as a diminutive form of Cosmopolites sordidus. Antennae composed of eight antennomeres, a scape, pedicel and flagellum composed of six flagellomeres. The last flagellomere is the antennal club. Both flagellum and antennal club composed of most sensilla. According to research, there are five types of sensilla: sensilla trichodea, sensilla chaetica type 1 and 2, sensilla basiconica, and sensilla gemmiformia; and cuticular grooves found in the species.

Biology
It is one of the most common pest that attack banana and plantains. Adults are found in numbers in decaying trunks and bores in the decaying corms and stalks of banana.

References 

Curculionidae
Insects of Sri Lanka
Beetles described in 1838